Prime Scholars is an academic publisher of 56 open-access scientific journals. Notably, they have published several articles fraudulently using famous people as authors, despite those people having passed away long ago and not having ever been involved in any research (Charlotte Brontë, William Faulkner, and Walt Whitman, for example). The publisher has also been criticized for listing scientists as editor-in-chief of some of their journals, without the consent of those individuals. For example, the journal Current Neurobiology lists reputed neuroscientist Marina Picciotto as its editor-in-chief, who professed to be "appalled" by this identity theft.

The company claims to be based in London, but the office at the address provided is where "hundreds of UK companies are incorporated".

See also
Predatory publishing

References

External links

Academic publishing companies
Open access publishers